Naser Ismail Aliji (born 27 December 1993) is a professional footballer who plays as a left-back for Romanian Liga I club FC Voluntari. Born in Macedonia, he played for Switzerland at youth international levels, and made his senior debut for Albania in 2015.

Club career

Early career
Aliji was born in Kumanovo and is of Albanian ethnicity. He lived there until he was four years old, at which time his mother moved to Baden, Switzerland together with her two other siblings, a sister and a brother, to join their father, who had been working there for many years. Aliji started his youth football at age of 4 when he was sent by his brother to play with FC Baden. Aged 9, he moved to FC Aarau for one year and then he joined FC Basel in 2008. Later he played in their U-18 team and in their U21 team where he received various individual prizes as the youngster of the year.

Basel 
Aliji signed his first professional contract with FC Basel on 20 June 2013 and joined their first team. Aliji made his first team debut on 17 August as he was substituted in during the Swiss Cup first round match against BSC Old Boys. He played his first match in the starting eleven in the Swiss Cup quarter-final against Le Mont on 5 February 2014 as Basel won 6–1. One minute before half time he gave the final pass to Marco Streller for him to score the third goal of the game. On 16 March 2014 Aliji made his Swiss Super League debut and played the full 90 minutes at St. Jakob-Park in the 5–0 home win, against Aarau. At the end of the 2013–14 Super League season Aliji won the league championship with Basel. They also reached the final of the 2013–14 Swiss Cup, but were beaten 2–0 by Zürich after extra time. During the 2013–14 Champions League season Basel reached the group stage and finished the group in third position. Thus they qualified for the Europa League knockout phase where they advanced as far as the quarter-finals.

The season 2014–15 was also a successful one for Basel. Aliji scored his first goal for the team in the away game in the Stadion Brügglifeld on 19 July 2014 as Basel won 2–1 against Aarau. Despite this goal in the first match of the season and despite the fact that Basel had entered the Champions League in the group stage reaching the knockout phase on 9 December 2014 as they managed a 1–1 draw at Anfield against Liverpool, Aliji totaled just 17 appearances during the first half of the season, 5 (of 18) League, 3 (of 3) in the Cup and just 1 (of 6) in the Champions League, as well 8 further appearances in test games, mostly as substitute. Because Sousa did not rely upon Aliji and he could not make the starting eleven Basel looked for another solution. On 17 January 2015 it was announced that Aliji would be lent out to Vaduz to gain first team playing experience.

At the end of the season Basel won the championship for the sixth time in a row.

Loan on Vaduz
In January 2015 during the Winter transfers window, Aliji was loaned out to the fellow Swiss Super League team FC Vaduz for 1 year and half. Aliji made his debut for Vaduz on 15 February 2015 in the away match against Aarau, playing the full 90 minutes of the game, which ended in a 1–0 victory. Until the end of the league season Aliji played 17 matches all as a starter and substituted off in just one occasion. Aliji won the 2014–15 Liechtenstein Cup playing two matches including the final against Triesenberg on 13 May 2015 when Vaduz won 5–0 and Aliji played the full 90-minutes.

Having won the 2014–15 Liechtenstein Cup, Vaduz gained the right to participate in the 2015–16 UEFA Europa League first qualifying round, where they were shorted to play against San Marino side La Fiorita. In the first leg, Aliji played the full 90-minutes match in a crucial away 0–5 victory. Then Vaduz qualified in the next round beating La Fiorita 5–1 in the second leg and winning on aggregate 10–1. Vaduz finds as an opponent in the 2015–16 UEFA Europa League Second qualifying round the Estonia side Nõmme Kalju. Aliji managed to play another full 90-minutes European match in the first leg to help his team to take a 3–1 victory.

Return to Basel
Following an injury to Adama Traoré with the Ivory Coast national football team due to the absence of other left-backs, Basel used the contract rights to recall Aliji to their first team squad from the loan to Vaduz. Under trainer Urs Fischer Aliji won the Swiss Super League championship at the end of the 2015–16 Super League season for the third time. For the club it was the seventh title in a row and their 19th championship title in total.

On 1 July 2016 Basel announced that Aliji was leaving the club and would move to Germany. During his time with their first team, Aliji played a total of 64 games for Basel scoring one goal. 21 of these games were in the Swiss Super League, nine in the Swiss Cup, four in the UEFA competitions (Champions League and Europa League) and 22 were friendly games. He scored his sole goal in the domestic league.

1. FC Kaiserslautern
On 1 July 2016, Aliji joined 2. Bundesliga side 1. FC Kaiserslautern on a free transfer, signing a contract until June 2019.

He should have compensated for the departure of Chris Löwe on the left side of defence. Initially a regular player under coach Tayfun Korkut, Aliji was not able to convince FCK and was sorted out under Korkut's successor Norbert Meier. Because, initially, he was unable to find a new club, Aliji's contract with FCK was terminated on 31 August 2017, two years before it expired, against payment of a severance payment.

Later years
Following this, Aliji was without a club for six months. In January 2018 he joined Italian club Virtus Entella in Serie B for six months. He later played for Dinamo București and Budapest Honvéd. He joined Voluntari in the summer of 2022.

Personal life
In the summer of 2018 Aliji returned to Switzerland to be with his  father who had a cancer diagnosis.

International career
Despite playing for Macedonia youth national teams and Switzerland youth national teams, Aliji did not exclude the option of representing Albania at international level. On 17 December 2014, the FSHF representative for talents in Switzerland, Sokol Dauti, confirmed that Aliji had decided to represent Albania and begun the procedure to get an Albanian passport. Three of his former teammates at Basel Taulant Xhaka, Shkëlzen Gashi and Arlind Ajeti play for Albania, despite having represented Swiss youth national teams. On 5 March 2015, Aliji received Albanian citizenship alongside his teammate Ajeti, and became the first player ever from Macedonia to wear the Albania national team shirt.

Aliji received his first call-up to the Albania national team by the coach Gianni De Biasi for the UEFA Euro 2016 qualifying match against Armenia on 29 March 2015. Despite the invitation he wasn't eligible yet to play for Albania in competitive matches as he hadn't yet received the go ahead from FIFA. Then Aliji was called up again in the next match of Albania, the friendly one against France on 13 June 2015. He debuted for Albania at international level against France playing the full 90-minutes match which finished in a 1–0 crucial victory against the UEFA Euro 2016 hosts with a free-kick scored by Ergys Kaçe in the 43rd minute.

On 21 May 2016, Aliji was named in Albania's preliminary 27-man squad for UEFA Euro 2016, and in Albania's final 23-man UEFA Euro 2016 squad on 31 May.

Aliji didn't manage to play any minute of all Group A matches as Albania were eliminated by ranking in the 3rd place behind hosts France against which lost 2–0 and Switzerland against which they also lost 1–0 in the opening match and ahead of Romania by beating them 1–0 in the closing match with a goal by Armando Sadiku. Albania finished the group in the third position with three points and with a goal difference –2, and was ranked last in the third-placed teams, which eventually eliminated them.

Career statistics

Club

International

Honours

Club
Basel
Swiss Super League: 2013–14, 2014–15, 2015–16
Swiss Cup runner-up: 2013–14

Vaduz
Liechtenstein Cup: 2014–15

Budapest Honvéd
Magyar Kupa: 2019–20

Individual
FC Basel Rookies of the Year: 2011, 2013

References

External links
 
 Profile at FC Basel 
 Profile season 2015/16 at Swiss Football League Website 
 
 
 Naser Aliji profile at FSHF.org

1993 births
Living people
Sportspeople from Kumanovo
Sportspeople from Aargau
Association football defenders
Albanian footballers
Albania international footballers
Swiss men's footballers
Switzerland youth international footballers
Switzerland under-21 international footballers
Macedonian footballers
Macedonian emigrants to Switzerland
Albanian emigrants to Switzerland
Swiss people of Macedonian descent
Swiss people of Albanian descent
Albanian footballers from North Macedonia
UEFA Euro 2016 players
FC Basel players
FC Vaduz players
1. FC Kaiserslautern players
Virtus Entella players
FC Dinamo București players
Budapest Honvéd FC players
FC Voluntari players
Swiss Super League players
2. Bundesliga players
Serie B players
Liga I players
Nemzeti Bajnokság I players
Albanian expatriate sportspeople in Germany
Swiss expatriate sportspeople in Germany
Macedonian expatriate sportspeople in Germany
Expatriate footballers in Germany
Albanian expatriate sportspeople in Italy
Swiss expatriate sportspeople in Italy
Macedonian expatriate sportspeople in Italy
Expatriate footballers in Italy
Albanian expatriate sportspeople in Romania
Swiss expatriate sportspeople in Romania
Macedonian expatriate sportspeople in Romania
Expatriate footballers in Romania
Albanian expatriate sportspeople in Hungary
Swiss expatriate sportspeople in Hungary
Macedonian expatriate sportspeople in Hungary
Expatriate footballers in Hungary
Expatriate footballers in Liechtenstein
Albanian expatriate sportspeople in Liechtenstein
Swiss expatriate sportspeople in Liechtenstein
Macedonian expatriate sportspeople in Liechtenstein